The chief justice was the personal legal representative of the King of Hungary, who issued decrees of judicial character on behalf of the monarch authenticated with the royal seal, performed national notarial activities and played an important role in the organisation of lawyers training. Later the chief justice was the head of the Royal Court of Justice and the Tribunal of the Chief Justice, the highest legal forum of civil cases.

Origins

The office of personalis evolved since the early 15th century within the royal chancellery. In the beginning, the king was represented by the secret chancellor in the judiciary (judge of personal presence). The first known chief justice was Janus Pannonius, a Croato-Hungarian humanist poet who returned to Hungary after finishing studies at the University of Padua in 1458, the coronation year of Matthias Corvinus. Pannonius served as chief justice until 1459, when he was elected as the Bishop of Pécs. Until the 1464 reform, the complete list of chief justices is unknown. It is certain that Albert Vetési, Bishop of Veszprém held the office for a short time around 1460.

From the 1370s, during the reign of Louis I, the lord chancellor also had a judicial function. He became judge of special presence. This position was held by Roman Catholic prelates, therefore the judicial function was performed by their deputies. Consequently, a dual judicial system existed in the Kingdom of Hungary until the administrative reform of 1464.

Formation
Matthias Corvinus (formally Matthias I), after restoring the Holy Crown of Hungary for 60,000 ducats, was allowed to retain certain Hungarian counties with the title of king and was crowned legitimately on 29 March 1464. After the second and valid coronation, Matthias began to reorganize the administrative and judicial structure. He merged the two courts ("special" and "personal judicatures") and established the institution of chief justice as a full-fledged judge to the head of the Royal Court. The chancellery was also unified and the new office of "lord- and vice-chancellor" lost all of its judicial functions.

The Tribunal of the Chief Justice also established where the so-called "towns of chief justice" forwarded those appeals concerning litigations. The tribunal chaired by the chief justice functioned as appellate court for the "towns of treasurer" too. According to the Tripartitum (1514) five settlements were towns of chief justice: Székesfehérvár, Esztergom, Lőcse (Levoča), Kisszeben (Sabinov) and Szakolca (Skalica). The status meant some independence, so was sought after by the towns. The Quadripartitum (1551), which never came to force, also mentions the seven mining towns of Upper Hungary as towns of chief justice.

Functions and development
The Act LXVIII of 1486 listed the chief justice among the "ordinary judges" beside the palatine and the judge royal. The chief justice also served as keeper of the monarch's judicial seal. In contrast, the secret chancellor assumed his role in the arbitration only on special occasions. The ordinary judges were able to make judgements on any matter and also could appoint deputies and masters of judgement. In practice, this meant that the judicial power decoupled itself from the executive branch (the king). The Act XLII of 1492 (during the reign of Vladislaus II) also confirmed these authorities.

During the first decades the position was held by ecclesiastical dignitaries. Thomas Drági was the first secular office-holder between 1486 and 1490. There had been a growing demand to fill the position by secular jurists and professionals on a permanent basis. That finally occurred at the beginning of the 16th century when the Act IV of 1507 decreed that the office must be occupied by a secular person with legal practice. Despite the new law the influential and powerful cardinal Tamás Bakócz chose his prelate relatives for the office. The importance of the office of chief justice was made clear when Buda became the permanent residence of the Tribunal of the Chief Justice. The Act LV of 1514 also emphasized the appointment of secular office-holders. After that the secular and ecclesiastical elite agreed with each other and István Werbőczy, creator of the Tripartitum was appointed later in 1516.

After the battle of Mohács (1526) the reigning chief justice Miklós Thuróczy swore allegiance to Ferdinand I. As a result, the other elected king, John Zápolya also appointed a chief justice for his own royal court in the person of Benedek Bekényi.

Charles III divided the Curia Regia into two courts in 1723: the Tabula Septemviralis (Court of the seven) and the Tabula Regia Iudiciaria (Royal Court of Justice). The latter functioned under the direction of the chief justice, in the case of prevention, of the elder Baron Court. The Tabula Regia Iudiciaria was constituted of two prelates, two Barons of the Court, two deputy judge advocates of the Kingdom: the vice Palatine, the deputy judge advocate of the Curia Regia, four prothonotaries, four assessors of the Kingdom, four assessors of the archdiocese, four adjunctive assessors.

The chief justice also had a political function: he became speaker of the occasionally convened lower house of the Diet of Hungary. During the Habsburg-dominated kingdom a customary law emerged whereby jurists to the office of chief justice were chosen from the lesser nobility, however later sometimes aristocrats were also appointed to that position. The Tribunal of the Chief Justice was one of the positions used for the development, patronage and rise of a new aristocracy which was loyal to the House of Habsburg. For the new "official nobility" the position of chief justice was the springboard to obtain higher positions (mostly judge royal, president of the Hungarian Court Chamber, vice-chancellor).

János Zarka opened and presided over the last feudal Diet of 1848. During the Hungarian Revolution of 1848 the position became vacant. After the defeat of the War of Independence Francis Joseph I applied neo-absolutist governance ("Bach system") and integrated the Kingdom of Hungary to the Habsburg Empire. Due to the fall of the Bach system in 1861, the position of chief justice, among others, was revived again and István Melczer took the office. According to the Austro-Hungarian Compromise of 1867 the judicial system had been converted and modernized; the chief justice lost all of its features and the position was officially discontinued.

List of known chief justices

Kingdom of Hungary (1000–1538)

Hungarian Civil War (1526–1538)

Kingdom of Hungary (1538–1867)

16–17th century

18–19th century

See also
 Judge royal
 Curia Regia

Footnotes

References

  Bertényi, Iván (1996). A magyar királyi udvar tisztségviselői a középkorban ("Officials of the Hungarian royal court in the Middle Ages"). Rubicon, 1996/1–2.
  Bónis, György (1971). A jogtudó értelmiség a Mohács előtti Magyarországon ("Hungarian intelligentsia having legal expertise in the period before the battle of Mohács"). Akadémiai Kiadó, Budapest.
  Fraknói, Vilmos (1899). Werbőczi István (1458–1541). Magyar Történeti Életrajzok, Magyar Történelmi Társulat, Budapest.
 Gergely, András (2000). The Hungarian State.Thousand years in Europe. Korona Publishing House, Budapest.
  Fallenbüchl, Zoltán (1988). Magyarország főméltóságai ("High Dignitaries in Hungary"). Maecenas Könyvkiadó. .
  Horváth, Gyula Csaba (2011): A 18. századi magyar főméltóságok családi kapcsolati hálózata.
  Kubinyi, András (1957). "A kincstári személyzet a XV. század második felében." Tanulmányok Budapest Múltjából. Vol. 12. (1957). 25–49.
  Kubinyi, András (2000). "Vitéz János és Janus Pannonius politikája Mátyás uralkodása idején" ("The Politics of János Vitéz and Janus Pannonius During the Reign of King Matthias"). In: Bartók, István – Jankovits, László – Kecskeméti, Gábor (ed.). Humanista műveltség Pannóniában. Művészetek Háza, University of Pécs.
  Kubinyi, András (2004). "Adatok a Mátyás-kori királyi kancellária és az 1464. évi kancelláriai reform történetéhez." Publicationes Universitatis Miskolciensis Sectio Philosophica. Vol. 9. No. 1. (2004). 25–58.
  Markó, László (2006). A magyar állam főméltóságai Szent Istvántól napjainkig: Életrajzi Lexikon ("Great Officers of State in Hungary from King Saint Stephen to Our Days: A Biographical Encyclopedia"). 2nd edition, Helikon Kiadó. 
 Szende, Katalin (1999). "Was there a bourgeoisie in medieval Hungary?" In: Nagy, Balázs – Sebők, Marcell (ed.). ... The Man of Many Devices, Who Wandered Full Many Ways... Central European University Press.  Cloth.
  Véber, János (2009). Két korszak határán, Váradi Péter pályaképe és írói életműve. Pázmány Péter Catholic University, Ph.D. thesis.

Laws and rules

  1486. évi LXVIII. törvénycikk
  1492. évi XLII. törvénycikk
  1507. évi IV. törvénycikk
  1514. évi LV. törvénycikk
  1608. évi (k. e.) III. törvénycikk
  1609. évi LXX. törvénycikk
  1751. évi VI. törvénycikk
  1764/65. évi V. törvénycikk

External links
 National Archives of Hungary (MOL) – Judicial Archives (13th century – 1869)

 
Legal history of Hungary
1464 establishments in Europe
1867 disestablishments in Europe